Newberry Castle is an Iron Age Hill Fort close to Combe Martin in Devon, England.It takes the form of an earthwork hillside enclosure close on an outcrop of a hill on the north eastern shoulder of Newberry Hill at an elevation 110 Metres above Sea Level.

References

Hill forts in Devon